Marián Štrbák (born 13 February 1986) is a Slovak football defender.

Career
Štrbák made his first Corgoň Liga appearance against FC Nitra.

Ahead of the 2019-20 season, Štrbák joined Czech club FK Blansko.

External links
FK Senica profile

References

1986 births
Living people
Slovak footballers
Slovak expatriate footballers
Association football defenders
FC Baník Prievidza players
FC ViOn Zlaté Moravce players
FK Senica players
FK Ústí nad Labem players
SFC Opava players
FC Silon Táborsko players
MŠK Rimavská Sobota players
FK Iskra Borčice players
FC ŠTK 1914 Šamorín players
Slovak Super Liga players
2. Liga (Slovakia) players
Czech National Football League players
Place of birth missing (living people)
Expatriate footballers in the Czech Republic
Slovak expatriate sportspeople in the Czech Republic